Hans-Henning von Fölkersamb (25 November 1889 – 5 January 1984) was a Generalmajor in the Luftwaffe during World War II.

Biography 
Hans-Henning, Freiherr von Fölkersamb, was born in Metz, Lorraine. During World War I, he served as an officer in infantry, in France, Russia, Turkey, Austria and Romania. He was promoted to the rank of Hauptmann, captain, on 20 June 1918.

Hans-Henning von Fölkersamb rejoined the army in 1934. He was assigned to the Luftwaffe, as an intelligence officer, in Münster. Promoted Major in August 1935, he is assigned to the Air-District-Command IV, before being transferred in the 6th Luftwaffendivision. When World War II broke out, Oberstleutnant von Fölkersamb still worked in the same unit. Promoted Oberst, Colonel, in December 1941, Fölkersamb is transferred in the 2nd Air-District-Command. From November 1942 to May 1944, Fölkersamb is in command of Military Support in Norway, Battle-Area West, North Africa and Eastern Front. Promoted to the rank of Generalmajor, Brigadier general, in April 1944, Hans-Henning von Fölkersamb was placed in the Führerreserve until the end of the war.

Hans-Henning von Fölkersamb died in 1984, in Tutzing, Germany.

References

Bibliography

 Hans von Fölkersamb on reocities.com
 Generale der Reichswehr und Wehrmacht mit F on Lexikon der Wehrmacht

1889 births
1984 deaths
Luftwaffe World War II generals
German Army personnel of World War I
Military personnel from Metz
People from Alsace-Lorraine
Prussian Army personnel
Major generals of the Luftwaffe